PTS-DOS (aka PTS/DOS) is a disk operating system, a DOS clone, developed in Russia by PhysTechSoft and Paragon Technology Systems.

History and versions 
PhysTechSoft was formed in 1991 in Moscow, Russia by graduates and members of MIPT, informally known as PhysTech. At the end of 1993, PhysTechSoft released the first commercially available PTS-DOS as PTS-DOS v6.4. The version numbering followed MS-DOS version numbers, as Microsoft released MS-DOS 6.2 in November 1993.

In 1995, some programmers left PhysTechSoft and founded Paragon Technology Systems. They took source code with them and released their own version named PTS/DOS 6.51CD as well as S/DOS 1.0 ("Source DOS"), a stripped down open-source version. According to official PhysTechSoft announcements, these programmers violated both copyright laws and Russian military laws, as PTS-DOS was developed in close relationship with Russia's military and thus may be subject to military secrets law.

PhysTechSoft continued development on their own and released PTS-DOS v6.6 somewhere between and presented PTS-DOS v6.65 at the CeBIT exhibition in 1997. The next version from PhysTechSoft, formally PTS/DOS Extended Version 6.70 was labeled PTS-DOS 2000 and is still being distributed as a last 16-bit PTS-DOS system, .

Paragon continued their PTS-DOS line and released Paragon DOS Pro 2000 (also known and labeled in some places as PTS/DOS Pro 2000). According to Paragon, this was the last version and all development since then ceased. Moreover, this release contained bundled source code of older PTS-DOS v6.51.

Later, PhysTechSoft continued developing PTS-DOS and finally released PTS-DOS 32, formally known as PTS-DOS v7.0, which added support for the FAT32 file system.

PTS-DOS is certified by the Russian Ministry of Defense.

Commands 
The following list of commands are supported by PTS-DOS 2000 Pro.

 APPEND
 ASK
 ASSIGN
 ATTR
 BEEP
 BREAK
 CALL
 CD
 CHDIR
 CHKDSK
 CHOICE
 CLS
 COMMAND
 COPY
 CTTY
 DATE
 DEBUG
 DEL
 DIR
 DISKCOPY
 DISP
 ECHO
 ECHONLF
 ERASE
 EXE2BIN
 EXIT
 FDISK
 FIND
 FOR
 FORMAT
 GOTO
 HISTORY
 IF
 JOIN
 KEYB
 LABEL
 LOADFIX
 MD
 MEM
 MKDIR
 MKZOMBIE
 MODE
 MORE
 NLSFUNC
 PATH
 PAUSE
 PRINT
 PROMPT
 RD
 RDZOMBIE
 REM
 REN
 RENAME
 REPLACE
 RMDIR
 SET
 SETDRV
 SETVER
 SHARE
 SHIFT
 SORT
 SUBST
 SYS
 TIME
 TREE
 TYPE
 UNINSTALL
 VER
 VERIFY
 VOL

Exclusive commands

UNINSTALL 
This command is specific to PTS/DOS 2000. Paragon's description is (quote)
 Purpose: Restores the booting of a system installed before PTS-DOS on the disk and restores its the boot sector.
 Syntax: UNINSTALL filename [drive:]

Hardware requirements 
 Intel 80286 CPU or better
 512 KB RAM or more

See also 
 Comparison of DOS operating systems
 АДОС, unrelated to Russian MS-DOS
 Russian MS-DOS

References

External links 
 
 Unofficial PTS-DOS FAQ
 Paragon GmbH homepage  

DOS variants
Assembly language software
Disk operating systems
1993 software